The Florida Winter Series was a single-seater racing category organised by the Ferrari Driver Academy. The series was launched on October 18, 2013 and held its inaugural and only season in 2014.

The series
The series held all its races in the state of Florida. Due to the mild climate, sports facilities and logistics Florida was chosen to host all four rounds of the inaugural championship. For the first race many high-profile drivers were attracted. Formula One driver Jules Bianchi and IndyCar Series driver Simona de Silvestro were among them. Notable stars from the series included Max Verstappen and Lance Stroll, and Nicholas Latifi; all of whom made it to Formula One. Ed Jones eventually won an INDYCAR developmental series that led to him earning a full-time INDYCAR ride.

The car
The series used the Tatuus FA010B chassis. This car is also used in Formula Abarth and other regional championships. The car is built to Formula 3 safety regulations to ensure the drivers safety. The car is powered by a 1400cc Fiat-FPT engine producing 190hp.

Cancellation
On November 6, 2014, Ferrari cancelled the Florida Winter Series for the 2015 season.

References

External links
 

Ferrari
2013 establishments in Florida
Auto racing series in the United States
Formula racing series
Motorsport competitions in Florida